Piotr Aleksander Adamczyk (born March 21, 1972) is a Polish film, television, voice and theatre actor. He is known for portraying pianist and composer Frédéric Chopin in the biographical film Chopin: Desire for love (2002), Pope John Paul II in the TV miniseries Karol: A Man Who Became Pope (2005) and its sequel Karol: The Pope, The Man (2006), Tomas in the Marvel Cinematic Universe Disney+ series Hawkeye (2021) and Sergei Nikulov in the Apple TV+ original science fiction space drama series For All Mankind (2021–present).

Early life and education
From his early childhood Adamczyk wanted to become an actor. He attended the Machulski youth theatre group in Warsaw. Thanks to an international scholarship, he was able to attend international theatre workshops in the United Kingdom and Germany. He continued his acting education by attending the Theatre Academy in Warsaw. During his second academic year, he won a scholarship from the Soros Foundation which allowed him to attend the British American Drama Academy for one year, where he performed Hamlet for his diploma.

Career
Once he graduated from the Theatre Academy, Adamczyk was hired by the Teatr Współczesny in Warsaw. His career in the film industry however grew much more intensively. His role of Stawrogin in Fyodor Dostoyevsky’s The Possessed started Piotr’s long list of roles. The breakthrough in his career was his part as Frédéric Chopin in the film Chopin: Desire for Love - and became a Polish star.

The climax of his popularity was reached when he played the title role of another Polish historical figure in a two part Italian TV movie - Karol the Man who became Pope and Karol: The Pope - The Man. The movie was viewed by several dozen million viewers, and made him popular in Italy, Latin America and many other Catholic countries.

Adamczyk also managed to take advantage of his popularity abroad to play at the Sala Uno Theatre in Rome, in Italian. He also played in Liliana Cavani’s movie Einstein and in the Portuguese production Second Life.

In 2014, Adamczyk, Bartosz Opania and Paweł Domagała starred in the comedy film Wkreceni.

He has been in over 800 radio roles and around 100 theatre, television and film parts. He is also appreciated for his roles in Polish dubbing. In animated films he played, among others, Melman the giraffe in Madagascar, Lightning McQueen in Cars and Syndrome in The Incredibles.

He has received many prestigious awards in Poland. In 2011, he was voted the most popular Polish actor once again.

Filmography

Awards and nominations 
He was awarded Medal for Merit to Culture – Gloria Artis (2014).

References

Further reading
 Short biography
 "'You're crazy', (Pope John Paul II) tells (Piotr Adamczyk)", BBC, November 17, 2004

External links 
 

1972 births
Living people
Polish male television actors
Polish male voice actors
Male actors from Warsaw
Polish film actors
Polish male stage actors
Polish television actors
Polish male film actors
Aleksander Zelwerowicz National Academy of Dramatic Art in Warsaw alumni
Recipients of the Medal for Merit to Culture – Gloria Artis
Recipients of the Silver Medal for Merit to Culture – Gloria Artis